Betty Diamond (born 11 May 1948, in Hartford, Connecticut) is an American physician and researcher. She is director of the Institute of Molecular Medicine at Northwell Health's Feinstein Institute for Medical Research in Manhasset, NY. She was elected a member of the National Academy of Sciences in 2022.

Education
Betty Diamond received her B.A. in Art History (Magna Cum) from Radcliffe College in 1969 and her M.D. from Harvard Medical School in 1973. In 1976 she began her residency at Columbia Presbyterian Medical Center, New York, NY and in 1979 embarked on post-doctoral fellowship in Immunology with Dr. Matthew Scharff at the Albert Einstein College of Medicine, Bronx, NY.

Academic career
Diamond has been on the faculty and chief of rheumatology at both Einstein and Columbia. She is currently head of the Center for Autoimmune and Musculoskeletal Disease at The Feinstein Institute for Medical Research and Professor of Molecular Medicine at Hofstra Northwell School of Medicine.  She has been on the board of the American College of Rheumatology, is past president of the American Association of Immunology, and is a member of the Institute of Medicine.  She is also past chair of the scientific advisory board of the National Institute of Arthritis and Musculoskeletal and Skin Diseases (NIAMS) and has been on their Scientific Council.

Research
Diamond's primary interests are in the mechanisms of central and peripheral tolerance of autoreactive B cells, and the defects in these mechanisms that are present in autoimmune disease, as well as the role of antibodies in brain disease. Diamond identified the first idiotype marker on anti-DNA antibodies in patients with lupus, and discovered that anti-DNA antibodies in patients and mice shared characteristics with antibodies to pneumococcal polysaccharide. Diamond showed that a single base change in a protective anti-pneumococcal antibody could convert it into a potentially pathogenic anti-DNA antibody. She also found that a peptide that binds to 50% of anti-DNA antibodies in lupus patients and mice represents an epitope on glutamate receptors of the brain and can destroy neurons. Antibodies against the epitope are present in the cerebrospinal fluid and in brain tissue of patients with neuropsychiatric lupus. Her work provides a mechanism for aspects of neuropsychiatric lupus, and more generally for acquired changes in cognition and behavior. Diamond also studies the role that hormones may play in the development of lupus.

Awards and honors
(from 2000–present):
 Elected Member of the National Academy of Sciences, 2022 
 Scientific Leadership Award, SLE Lupus Foundation, 2000
 Outstanding Investigator Award of the ACR, 2001
 Lee Howley Award from the Arthritis Foundation, 2002
 Recognition Award from the National Association of MD-PhD Programs, 2004
 Honorary Alumna Award, Albert Einstein College of Medicine, 2004
 Klemperer Award New York Academy of Medicine and Arthritis Foundation (NY Chapter), 2004
 Klemperer award, American College of Rheumatology Institute of Medicine, 2005
 Institute of Medicine, 2006
 Fellow, AAAS, 2006
 Evelyn V. Hess research Award, Lupus Foundation of America, Inc., 2008
 American College of Rheumatology Mentor Award 2011

References 

1948 births
Living people
American immunologists
American rheumatologists
Harvard Medical School alumni
Radcliffe College alumni
Fellows of the American Association for the Advancement of Science
Members of the United States National Academy of Sciences
Members of the National Academy of Medicine